Terry Ralph Brown is an American politician. He served as an Independent member for the 22nd district of the Louisiana House of Representatives.

Brown was the son of June Hafer and Ralph Edison Brown. He attended Northwestern State University, where he earned his Bachelor of Arts. In 2012, Brown won the election for the 22nd district of the Louisiana House of Representatives. He succeeded Billy Chandler. Brown did not run for re-election in 2020, and was succeeded by Gabe Firment.

References 

Living people
Place of birth missing (living people)
Year of birth missing (living people)
Louisiana Independents
Members of the Louisiana House of Representatives
21st-century American politicians
Northwestern State University alumni